Statistics of Czechoslovak First League in the 1965–66 season.

Overview
It was contested by 14 teams, and Dukla Prague won the championship. Ladislav Michalík was the league's top scorer with 15 goals. The match between Sparta Prague and Slavia Prague had an attendance of 50,105 - setting a league record.

Stadia and locations

League standings

Results

Top goalscorers

References

Czechoslovakia - List of final tables (RSSSF)

Czechoslovak First League seasons
Czech
1965–66 in Czechoslovak football